Pasi Puistola (born September 16, 1978) is a Finnish professional ice hockey player.

References

External links 

1978 births
Finnish ice hockey defencemen
Ilves players
Ässät players
Tappara players
HV71 players
Living people
HC Donbass players
Finnish expatriate ice hockey players in Sweden
Ice hockey people from Tampere